Mojtame-ye Chah Molla (also Romanized as Mojtame`-ye Chāh Mollā) is a village in Rudbar Rural District, in the Central District of Rudbar-e Jonubi County, Kerman Province, Iran. At the 2006 census, its population was 336, in 79 families.

References 

Populated places in Rudbar-e Jonubi County